The European Association for Signal Processing (EURASIP) is an international scientific society for the theory and application of signal processing. It was established on the 1st of September 1978.It hosts the European Signal Processing Conference (EUSIPCO), which has been held annually since 1993 in various European locations. It publishes a series of science journals, as EURASIP Journal on Advances in Signal Processing, that have also an open access policy.

External links 

 eurasip.org
 Springeropen: EURASIP Journal

International scientific organizations based in Europe
1978 establishments in Europe
Science and technology in Europe
Organizations established in 1978